Kusa or KUSA may refer to:

 Kusa, Russia, a town in Chelyabinsk Oblast, Russia
 Kusa, Latvia, a village in Madona District, Latvia
 Kusa, Oklahoma, United States
 Kusa, indigenous name of Beles River (in Gumuz language)
 KUSA (TV), a television station (channel 9) licensed to Denver, Colorado, United States
 Kennel Union of South Africa
 Kusa, an alternative spelling of Kusha (disambiguation)
 Kusa, a type of squash (fruit) from Palestine closely related to the zucchini
Kurashiki University of Science and the Arts, a university in Kurashiki, Okayama, Japan